English Babu Desi Mem is a 1996 Hindi-language romantic comedy film, starring Shah Rukh Khan and Sonali Bendre. It is loosely based on the American romantic comedy It Started in Naples (1960). The rights to this film are now owned by Shah Rukh Khan's Red Chillies Entertainment.

Synopsis 
Vikram Mayur, a rich Indian, born and raised in England, returns home to Bombay, to look for his late brother Hari's eight-year-old son, Nandlal (or Nandu) raised by his caring aunt Bijuriya. Vikram faces a dilemma when he is torn between choosing to take Nandu back to England to learn his family's business or risk throwing it all away by staying in India to be with Bijuriya, whom he slowly falls in love with. This film features Shah Rukh Khan in a triple role as Gopal Mayur and his sons Hari and Vikram.

Plot 
Gopal Mayur is a billionaire businessman. He is the head of the Mayur family, a rich NRI business family, living in London for five generations. He has two sons. The elder son, Hari, is a registered pilot with a deep affection for his ancestral India, spending much of his time at Mini India, on the outskirt of London. Gopal, who is seemingly not a fan of India, and is not impressed by the fact that his son is so fond of their ancestral country, has promised his English business partner that Hari will marry the latter's daughter, who holds an affection for Hari. However, Hari does not want to marry an Englishwoman and pleads with his family to call off the wedding, but nobody listens to him. On his wedding day, he runs away from his home and boards a plane, in order to escape to India. His plane crashes in Indian Ocean, and he is presumed dead by everyone.

Hari, however, washes ashore in Mumbai, still alive, and is found by a little girl named Bijuriya and her elder sister Katariya. Katariya restores him to health, by nursing him and taking care of him affectionately. After his recovery, Hari learns that he has been officially declared dead by the British Government, after a rescue mission failed to find his body. He takes this opportunity to start a new life in his beloved India, marrying Katariya, whom he has fallen in love with.

Katariya soon becomes pregnant with Hari's child. The happiness does not last for long, as a fire breaks out at their house during a Diwali celebration, mortally wounding Hari and Katariya, who both die shortly after the delivery of their son, Nandu. Bijuriya sacrifices her own education to raise Nandu, doing many things to earn money to feed him, before settling down with a job as a bar dancer.

Eight years later, Vikram Mayur, Gopal's younger son, who also holds a negative view on India, has succeeded his father as the president, chairman and owner of his family industries (while it is not revealed what happened to Gopal, who is never shown in the movie again). He soon becomes a successful and wealthy industrialist. Lawyer Madadgar, a family friend of Bijuriya and Katariya, watches an interview of Vikram on television, and realizes that he is Hari's younger brother and Nandu's uncle. He plots to bring him to India, in order to take away both Bijuriya and Nandu with him. He files a case against Hari, forcing Vikram to come to Mumbai, out of confusion.

Vikram learns that his brother survived the plane crash and lived in India for two years, during which he was married and had a son, before his actual death with his wife. Vikram believes that his brother's son is the next generation of their family industry, and so he should be taken back to London. Bijuriya, who dearly loves Nandu and does not want to part with him, objects to this. Bijuriya realizes that if Vikram goes to court, she will lose Nandu forever, and so she pretends to be Queen Rani Devi, who was Nandu's guardian. Vikram falls for her charade and slowly falls in love with her. But one day, her truth is exposed to him. Vikram decides to take his nephew back with him immediately. The nephew, who detests his newfound uncle and adores his aunt like a mother figure, protests this, but Vikram remains adamant.

Bijuriya forces Nandu to go with Vikram after getting to know that Nandu misses school and does petty jobs to earn money to marry off Bijuriya. She is forcibly taken to sleep with a goon Bheema Khalasi, who had his eyes on her. When Vikram learns about this, he comes to the hideout just before Bheema Khalasi is about to rape Bijuriya. Vikram overpowers the goon and saves Bijuriya. He is convinced that Bijuriya will be the best parent for his nephew. Vikram marries Bijuriya and takes her and his nephew back with him.

Cast 
Shahrukh Khan as Gopal / Hari / Vikram (Triple role)
Sonali Bendre as Bijuriya 
Kiran Kumar as Bheema Khalasi
Saeed Jaffrey as Lawyer Madadgar
Vivek Vaswani as Waiter 
Sudhir Dalvi as Doctor 
Rajeshwari Sachdev as Katariya
Mushtaq Khan as Hitman
Anju Mahendru as TV Interviewer

Soundtrack

Box office 
It is the third highest-grossing film of 1996 worldwide.

India
The film opened on Friday, 26 January 1996, across 145 screens, and earned  nett on its opening day. It grossed  nett in its opening weekend, and had a first week of  nett. The film earned a total of  nett, and was declared a "Flop" by Box Office India.

Overseas
It earned $135,000 (49.61 lakh) outside India. Overseas, it was the 3rd-highest-grossing film of 1996.

References

External links 
 

1996 films
1990s Hindi-language films
Twins in Indian films
Films scored by Nikhil-Vinay